Dirk Cussler (born 1961) is an American author. He is the son of best selling author Clive Cussler and a co-author of several Dirk Pitt adventure novels, as well as being the namesake of the Pitt character.

Early life and education
Cussler was born in 1961; he has an MBA from Berkeley.

Career
Cussler worked for many years in finance before assisting his father in writing the latest novels in the Dirk Pitt series. Cussler also plays an integral part in the non-profit foundation National Underwater and Marine Agency, which was founded by his father. Cussler is head of the council of NUMA and is also a member of the NUMA's Board of Trustees.

Bibliography
Black Wind (2004), co-written with Clive Cussler
Treasure of Khan (2006), co-written with Clive Cussler
Arctic Drift (2008), co-written with Clive Cussler
Crescent Dawn (2010), co-written with Clive Cussler
Poseidon's Arrow (2012), co-written with Clive Cussler
Havana Storm (2014), co-written with Clive Cussler    -    New York Times #1 Best Seller (November 2017)
Odessa Sea (2016), co-written with Clive Cussler
Celtic Empire (2019), co-written with Clive Cussler    -    Winner of 2020 Colorado Book Award for Best Mystery  
The Devil's Sea (2021)

References

External links
 

American adventure novelists
21st-century American novelists
Haas School of Business alumni
1961 births
Living people
American male novelists
21st-century American male writers